Edgar & Ellen is a book series and animated television series. Created by Simon & Schuster Children's Publishing, it is based on twelve-year-old orphaned twins who cause mischief and mayhem in their sickly sweet town, Nod's Limbs. The series currently contains nine books in addition to some side material. The twins' names are derived from American author and poet Edgar Allan Poe. Rare Beasts is the first book, followed by Tourist Trap, Under Town, Pet's Revenge, High Wire and Nod's Limbs, with a sequel series premiering just a year later, currently consisting of Hot Air, Frost Bites and Split Ends. The Mischief Manual, a book written in the voice of the twins themselves, hit the shelves in June 2007. A series of animated shorts premiered in 2006 and a weekly TV series premiered October 7, 2007 both on Nicktoons.

Edgar and Ellen live in a 13-story mansion on the edge of Nod's Limbs. Ellen is supposedly the older of the twins by two minutes and 13 seconds. They live with a hairy creature whom they refer to as Pet — a hairball with an eyeball. Their groundskeeper and caretaker, Heimertz, lives in a small shack just outside the house. Their mansion is located near a now disassembled junkyard, which the twins had lovingly dubbed their "Gadget Graveyard". They take parts from it and create marvelous contraptions for trouble.

Both of the twins wear striped footie pajamas and prank each other all day long—when they are not pranking the goody-goody townspeople of Nod's Limbs. They are clever, fearless, mischievous and creative. So creative, in fact, that their pranks often backfire hilariously.

Books
Rare Beasts (2003) 
Tourist Trap (2004) 
Under Town (2004) 
Pet's Revenge (2006) 
High Wire (2006) 
Nod's Limbs (2007) 
Mischief Manual (2007) 
Hair 'Em Scare 'Em: A Pop-Up Misadventure (2007)
Hot Air (2008) 
Frost Bites (2008) 
Split Ends (2009) 
Graphic Novelty: A Comic Collection (2009)
Books are published by Simon & Schuster in the United States, Canada, and the UK. Internationally books are published by Hachette Children's Book Australia, Pocket Jeunesse (France), Grupo SM in Spain and Editora Rocco in Brazil, among others.

Series one overviews
Rare Beasts

In Rare Beasts, the twins realize wreaking havoc can incur expenses, so they come up with a unique fundraising scheme: they'll nab the pets of Nod's Limbs and sell them as exotic animals for big bucks. But things don't go as planned when a purloined python gets hungry.

Tourist Trap
Mayor Knightleigh plans to destroy the gadget graveyard in order to build his own fancy hotel, using a group of celebrities to sponsor it. The twins manage to steal Stephanie Knightleigh's position as tour guide, taking the celebrities for a ghastly tour. The twins manage to sabotage the world's largest French toast festival, seemingly crushing Knightleigh's plans. They then find out that one tourist, Alex Sai, wrote a positive review on Nod's Limbs tourism.

Under Town
In Under Town, someone is tormenting the fine people of Nod's Limbs...and for once, it's not Edgar and Ellen. A new prankster is one step ahead of the twins, making mischief all over town. To discover the identity of this daring new foe, Edgar and Ellen must descend under town to stop this rash of copycat capers once and for all.

Pet's Revenge
In Pet's Revenge, Edgar has to plot solo when Ellen suddenly turns into a model of proper behavior. She (voluntarily) takes a bath and even accepts an invitation to a slumber party. Surely she's got a scheme up her (unusually clean) sleeve. Or has a hairy traitor managed to break up the devious duo...

High Wire
The twins' groundskeeper, Heimertz, has a dark and secret past shrouded in... the Big Top. When the circus comes to Nod's Limbs, everyone, especially Edgar and Ellen, gets their money's worth.

Nod's Limbs
The legend of Nod's missing golden limbs resurfaces, and a town-wide search commences. The entire town becomes obsessed with a treasure hunt that leads to the twins' turf, and the intruders dig out a collapsed cave to discover something far more shocking than gold.

Series two overviews
Hot Air
A few months after the disgrace of the Knightleighs and Augustus Nod's return from the dead, Edgar and Ellen are living as town heroes. But their easy life is threatened when an old nemesis returns, and to make matters more complicated, the first Knightleigh-less mayoral election is coming up.

Frost Bites
The twins' pursuit of Stephanie Knightleigh leads them to Frøsthaven, an Arctic village whose cheerful citizens and strange customs remind them of home. What makes this place a sugary sweet duplicate of Nod's Limbs? The secret, alas, is upon the forbidden slopes of the Glöggenheim, where dwells something that doesn't take kindly to being disturbed.

Split Ends
In order to thwart Stephanie's scheme, the twins must separate for the first time in their lives. Edgar's pursuit of the Midway Irregulars leads him to the forests of Cougar Falls and an unlikely partnership with an eccentric professional monster hunter, while Ellen and Pet find themselves in the decidedly inhospitable town of Lach Lufless.

Other books
Mischief Manual
The Mischief Manual is Edgar and Ellen's first chance to write a book in their own voice, "out from under the thumb of Charles Ogden". In this book, the twins share their trade secrets and inspirations for all manner of misdeeds and mayhem, including skill-building exercises, sample blueprints, and schemes to try at their home.

Setting
Nod's Limbs is the town where Edgar and Ellen live. It is so sickeningly sweet that it makes one's teeth hurt. There is no originality to the people that live there — which is why Edgar and Ellen are such a foil for them. The twins attempt to liven up shiny that one just wants to throw mud at it just to mix things up a bit. Living in it is, in the twins' own words, "like living inside a sugar cube".

Animated shorts
The animated shorts were co-produced with Canada-based Bardel Entertainment in association with YTV and Nicktoons Network. Nicktoons Network aired Edgar & Ellen two-minute shorts every day. There were 13 shorts in total. Six holiday specials began airing on Nicktoons Network on Labor Day weekend in 2006. The Back-to-School special, "Accept No Substitutes", was followed by a Halloween special, "Trick or Twins", a winter special, "Cold Medalists", a Valentine's special entitled "Crushed", and an April Fool's special "Nobody's Fools". The most recent one, called "Frog Days of Summer", aired on September 3, 2007.

The animated shorts mainly show the pranking activities of Edgar and Ellen, but also include supporting characters like Mayor Knightleigh, Bob the Intern, Pet, Buffy the Muffin lady, and several other entertaining Nod's Limbsians.

Edgar and Ellen hosted the Scare-a-thon on Nicktoons Network during Halloween weekend of 2005 and did so again in 2006.

TV series

The television series premiered on Nicktoons Network on October 7, 2007 and concluded on October 30, 2008, airing every Sunday at 5pm, 8pm and 4-5am Pacific. In Canada, the show aired on YTV and also premiered on Nicktoons in the UK around October 22, 2007.

The series has only been given two DVD releases. An exclusive DVD from Target that included the holiday specials "Trick or Twins" and "Cold Medalists" as well as another DVD titled "Mad Scientists" that included 13 episodes from the series. The rest of the series has yet to see any official release.

Episodes

Target stores
To promote Halloween in 2007, Target created a section in their stores with a haunted house façade featuring moving likenesses of the two, giant pictures of Edgar and Ellen, and branded and licensed products featuring them. They also featured prominently in-store displays.

Target also sold for Halloween an Edgar and Ellen DVD, which contains the episodes "Trick or Twins" and "Cold Medalists".

Del Taco
Halloween 2008 Del Taco promoted Edgar & Ellen in over 500 stores throughout the western United States.

References

External links 
 
 Spex Studios home page

Series of children's books
2007 American television series debuts
2008 American television series endings
2000s American animated television series
2007 Canadian television series debuts
2008 Canadian television series endings
2000s Canadian animated television series
American children's animated adventure television series
American children's animated comedy television series
American children's animated fantasy television series
American children's animated horror television series
Animated television series about orphans
Animated television series about siblings
Animated television series about twins
Canadian children's animated adventure television series
Canadian children's animated comedy television series
Canadian children's animated fantasy television series
Canadian children's animated horror television series
English-language television shows
Nicktoons (TV network) original programming
YTV (Canadian TV channel) original programming
American flash animated television series
Canadian flash animated television series
American television shows based on children's books
Canadian television shows based on children's books
Gothic television shows
Television series by DHX Media
Television series by Corus Entertainment